Norihide (written: 則秀 or 規秀) is a masculine Japanese given name. Notable people with the name include:

, Imperial Japanese Army officer
, Japanese samurai

Japanese masculine given names